The First Circus is a 1921 American short  silent animated film, produced and directed by Tony Sarg and Herbert M. Dawley, featuring a pair of prehistoric circus performers balancing upon a brontosaurus. A print has been preserved in the US Library of Congress film archive.

References

External links

 

1921 animated films
1921 short films
1921 films
1920s animated short films
American black-and-white films
American silent short films
Articles containing video clips
American animated short films
Circus films
Animated films about dinosaurs
Apatosaurinae
1920s American films